Theretra orpheus is a moth of the family Sphingidae. It is known from most of Africa.

The length of the forewings is 22–26 mm. The forewings are narrow and long, the termen rounded, especially in females, the apex is not very acute. The body is dark brown to dark grey, with numerous paler longitudinal lines. The forewings are grey, brown or ochreous brown, with one or more curved dark lines running from the inner margin near the base to the apex, separated by a conspicuous short pale stripe at the inner margin. The basal and anterior portion of the wing is usually darker. The hindwings are dark blackish grey.

Subspecies
Theretra orpheus orpheus (woodland and forest from the Cape to East Africa)
Theretra orpheus gauthieri Darge, 1991 (Príncipe)
Theretra orpheus intensa Rothschild & Jordan, 1903 (Comoro Islands)
Theretra orpheus malgassica Clark, 1933 (Madagascar)
Theretra orpheus pelius Rothschild & Jordan, 1903 (Uganda, Congo to Sierra Leone)
Theretra orpheus scotinus Rothschild & Jordan, 1915 (Nigeria)

References

Theretra
Moths described in 1834
Lepidoptera of Cameroon
Moths of Madagascar
Moths of Sub-Saharan Africa
Lepidoptera of West Africa
Lepidoptera of Uganda
Insects of the Central African Republic
Moths of the Comoros
Lepidoptera of the Republic of the Congo
Lepidoptera of Gabon
Lepidoptera of Tanzania